Nephus redtenbacheri is a species of beetle in family Coccinellidae. It is found in the Palearctic (Europe, North Africa, European Russia, Ciscaucasia, Siberia, the Russian Far East, Belarus, Ukraine, Moldova and Western Asia.

Ecology
In central Europe this beetle lives in the grass layer and detritus, feeding on scale insects, aphids, and especially Psocoptera. It occurs in marshes, including peatbogs, on marshy shores, in meadows, at wet forest edges, in flood-plain forests, and in dry habitats such as karst, sandy, and stone quarries, wastelands, and in fields. This is a rather rare species.

References

External links
 
 

Coccinellidae
Beetles described in 1846